STS-58 was a NASA mission flown by Space Shuttle Columbia launched from Kennedy Space Center, Florida, on 18 October 1993. The missions was primarily devoted to experiments concerning the physiological effects in space. This was the first in-flight use of the "Portable In-flight Landing Operations Trainer" (PILOT) simulation software. It was also the last time Columbia would land at Edwards Air Force Base, California.

Crew

Backup Crew

Mission highlights 

STS-58 was a 1993 shuttle mission dedicated to life sciences research. Columbias crew performed a series of experiments to gain knowledge on how the human body adapts to the weightless environment of space. Experiments focused on cardiovascular, regulatory, DNA, neurovestibular and musculoskeletal systems of the body. The experiments performed on Columbias crew and on laboratory animals (48 rats held in 24 cages), along with data collected on the SLS-1 mission (STS-40) in June 1991, will provide the most detailed and interrelated physiological measurements acquired in the space environment since the Skylab program in 1973 and 1974.

Crew members conducted experiments aimed at understanding bone tissue loss and the effects of microgravity on sensory perception. Two neurovestibular experiments investigating space motion sickness and perception changes were performed on the 2nd day as well. Astronauts Lucid and Fettman wore a headset, called an Accelerometer Recording Unit (ARU), designed to continually record head movements throughout the day.

Only one minor issue came up on 19 October 1993 associated with a circuit breaker that tripped, cutting off power temporarily to one of the rodent cages in the module. Flight controllers in Houston reported it was not caused by a short in the electrical system and the breaker was reset, restoring power to the cage.

McArthur and Blaha began using the Lower Body Negative Pressure device on flight day 3 (FD 3), which is being tested as a countermeasure for the detrimental effects of microgravity. All three flight crew members will collect urine and saliva samples and keep logs of their exercise and food and fluid intake as part of the Energy Utilization detailed supplementary objective. DSO 612 looks at the nutritial and energy requirements of crew members on long-duration space flights and the relationship between fluid and food consumption.

On 20 October 1993, though the space toilet is working fine, the crew detected a slight leak around the filter door before going to bed. They removed the filter and cleaned up about a teaspoon of water — much less than had been expected. As a precaution, a secondary fan separator unit was used to separate fluid from the air before cycling the air back into the cabin through the filter.

On 21 October 1993, Mission specialists Margaret Rhea Seddon (Payload commander), Shannon Lucid and David Wolf and Payload specialist Martin Fettman collected additional blood and urine samples for the series of metabolic experiments. Some of the samples will follow-up on the calcium absorption experiment performed on 20 October 1993. The experiment, sponsored by Dr. C. D. Arnaud of the University of California, San Francisco, studies the mechanisms of how calcium is maintained and used in bone metabolism in space. Based on preliminary results from the 1991 SLS-1 mission (STS-40), Dr. Arnaud believes the decrease in bone density is due to increased bone breakdown that is not compensated for by a subsequent increase in bone formation.

On 22 October 1993, using the on-board ham radio called SAREX-2 for Shuttle Amateur Radio Experiment, Blaha and Searfoss contacted school children at the Sycamore Middle School in Pleasant View, Tennessee, Gardendale Elementary in Pasadena, Texas and Naparima College in the Caribbean nation known as Trinidad and Tobago on 4 November 1993. The Standard Interface Rack (SIR), was tested by Searfoss to demonstrate that equipment can be removed from one rack location and reintegrated into another by a single crew member during orbital operations while maintaining reliable mechanical, data and power interfaces.

Another test flying aboard Columbia was the "Portable In-flight Landing Operations Trainer" (PILOT), a laptop computer simulator that was flown to qualify its use as a tool for helping the mission commander and pilot maintain their proficiency for approach and landing during longer duration Space Shuttle flights. The laptop was controlled using a joy stick hand controller similar to the one used to fly the orbiter in the final minutes before landing. The simulator would continue to see use up to and including the final Shuttle flight (STS-135).

On 23 October 1993, the payload crew members were scheduled to devote much of their time to metabolic studies of the 48 rodents on board the Spacelab science workshop. Payload commander Rhea Seddon, and crewmates David Wolf, Shannon Lucid and veterinarian Marty Fettman were scheduled to draw blood from the tails of some of the rodents, then inject a special isotope into the rodents to measure the volume of their plasma. Another blood draw would follow, to measure how weightlessness may be affecting the red blood cell count of the animals.

On 27 October 1993, Pilot Rick Searfoss put Columbia through some maneuvers as part of the Orbital Acceleration Research Experiment (OARE). The main goal of the experiment was to accurately measure the aerodynamic forces that act on the shuttle in orbit and during the early stages of entry. The information will be useful to scientists and engineers planning future Spacelab microgravity research flights in which experiments will need a quiet, motion-free environment to produce the best possible data. On 28 October 1993, after enjoying a half a day off, the astronauts aboard Columbia continued to collect scientific data on how humans and animals adapt to the absence of Earth's gravity.

Payload commander Rhea Seddon sent down a special message to her husband, Astronaut Office Chief Robert L. Gibson when she surpassed his total of 632 hours, 56 minutes in space. "He's still a really good guy, I still love him a lot, but I've got more hours in space than he does, so there!" she teased. Seddon acknowledged, however, that he has more launches and landings, having flown four times to her three.

Pilot Rick Searfoss took time out from snapping some infrared photography of the wildfires burning in southern California to say that the crew's thoughts are with the firefighters working to quell the flames and the residents whose homes are being threatened. He said he hoped the fires would be brought under control soon, and added that the photographs he was taking will be among some 4,000 frames that will be returned to Earth for meteorologists, geologists, ecologists and archeologists to study after the flight.

See also 

 List of human spaceflights
 List of Space Shuttle missions
 Outline of space science
 Space Shuttle

References

External links 
 STS-58 Video Highlights 

Space Shuttle missions
Edwards Air Force Base
Spacecraft launched in 1993